ʿAbd Allāh ibn Wahb al-Rāsibī (died 17 July 658 AD) was an early leader of the Khārijites. Of the Bajīla tribe, he was a tābiʿī, one who learned the teachings of Islam directly from a ṣaḥāba (companion) of Muḥammad. He prostrated himself in prayer so frequently that he developed calluses on his forehead, leading to the nickname, dhu ʾl-thafināt, "the man with the calluses".

ʿAbd Allāh fought under Ṣaʿd ibn Abī Waqqāṣ in the conquest of Iraq. In the first Muslim civil war, he took the side of the Caliph ʿAlī and fought for him at the Battle of Ṣiffīn (657). He opposed ʿAlī's decision to accept arbitration to end the civil war and joined the dissidents, soon to be known as Khārijites, gathering at Ḥarūrāʾ in Iraq. They later moved to Kūfa, where they elected ʿAbd Allāh as their amīr (commander) and not, as is sometimes claimed, the true caliph (successor of Muḥammad). They marched out in March 658 and were routed by ʿAlī in the Battle of Nahrawān on 17 July (9 Ṣafar 38 AH). ʿAbd Allāh was killed in battle.

Notes

Bibliography

658 deaths
Medieval Arabs killed in battle
Kharijites
People of the First Fitna
7th-century Arabs